Gabrielle Anne Carteris (born January 2, 1961) is an American actress and trade union leader. Her best known acting role was as Andrea Zuckerman during the early seasons of the 1990s television series Beverly Hills, 90210.

In 2012, Carteris was elected as executive vice president of SAG-AFTRA, a trade union representing over 100,000 actors and other professionals mainly in the United States. She assumed the position of acting president of the union following the death of the previous president, Ken Howard, on March 23, 2016. On April 9, 2016, Carteris was elected SAG-AFTRA president by national board to serve out the remainder of Howard's term. She was re-elected to the position in August 2017 and August 2019 by full membership vote.

Early years
Carteris was born in Scottsdale, Arizona, to Marlene, a realtor, and Ernest J. Carteris, a restaurant owner. She has a twin brother, James. Her father was of Greek ancestry whereas her mother is Jewish. Her parents separated six months after her birth. Carteris's mother moved with her children to San Francisco, California, where she set up a children's clothing store. While attending Redwood High School in Larkspur, California, she took an interest in the arts, studying ballet and performing as a mime on a European tour, at 16 years old. She graduated from Sarah Lawrence College, in 1983, with a bachelor's degree in liberal arts.

Career
After graduating from Sarah Lawrence College, Carteris' early television career found her typically cast as a teenager in such fare as ABC Afterschool Specials, CBS Schoolbreak Special, and the long-running soap opera Another World. This trend of playing significantly younger would continue when, in 1990, Carteris was cast in her best known role as studious school newspaper editor Andrea Zuckerman on Beverly Hills, 90210. At age 29, she was the oldest cast member to portray a 15-year-old, lying about her age in order to get the part. By 1993, while working for the show, her GABCO Productions company signed a deal with Rysher TPE.

Carteris left the series in 1995 and became the host of her own television talk show, entitled Gabrielle, which lasted only one season. She worked regularly as an actor and voiceover artist, amassing a considerable amount of post-90210 credits in television, film, and video games. She has gone on to become a mainstay on the made-for-television movie circuit, starring in nearly a dozen such films. Her first, Seduced and Betrayed, was released in 1995. She later became a regular presence on network television, appearing in episodes of such television series as Touched by an Angel, King of the Hill, NYPD Blue, JAG, Criminal Minds, and N.C.I.S. among others. She has appeared in several feature films. Carteris provided the voice for the Motorola intelligent assistant "Mya".

In 2019, Carteris appeared on Fox's BH90210 reboot, appearing both as Andrea Zuckerman and herself. The fictionalized version of herself was portrayed as sexually questioning and engaged in a brief relationship with former 90210 guest star turned fictional Fox executive Christine Elise.

SAG-AFTRA
Carteris became the executive vice president of SAG-AFTRA, following the Screen Actors' Guild (SAG) and American Federation of Television and Radio Artists (AFTRA) merger, in 2012. She became acting president of the union, following the death of president Ken Howard, on March 23, 2016, and was elected president on April 9, 2016, by national board of the union to complete Howard's remainder of his two-year term. In 2020 she was on a 3rd two-year term as the president after defeating challengers such as Esai Morales in 2017 and Matthew Modine in 2019 both by direct votes by union membership. She also serves as vice president of the California Labor Federation. In August 2020, she announced that there will be sharp cuts including a raise in the earnings floor to qualify for next year's SAG-AFTRA Health Plan due to two consecutive years of deficits and projected losses in years to come. Carteris did not seek re-election in 2021, backing Fran Drescher as her successor instead.

Personal life
While filming the pilot of Beverly Hills, 90210, Carteris began dating Charles Isaacs, a stockbroker. In 1991, Isaacs moved to L.A. to be with her. After two years together, they got married on May 3, 1992, at Santa Barbara's Four Seasons resort. Carteris and Isaacs have two daughters; Kelsey Rose (born May 11, 1994) and Mollie Elizabeth (born February 8, 1999).

Filmography

Film

Television

Video games

References

External links

1961 births
Living people
Presidents of SAG-AFTRA
Presidents of the Screen Actors Guild
American television actresses
American video game actresses
American voice actresses
American television talk show hosts
Actresses from California
Jewish American actresses
Actresses from San Francisco
Sarah Lawrence College alumni
American people of Greek-Jewish descent
20th-century American actresses
21st-century American actresses
Activists from California
American trade union leaders
Women trade union leaders
21st-century American Jews
Redwood High School (Larkspur, California) alumni